Julia I. Felsenthal (October 4, 1867 – November 21, 1954) was an American social worker based in Chicago. She was one of the founders of the National Council of Jewish Women.

Early life 
Julia I. Felsenthal was born in Chicago, the daughter of rabbi Bernhard Felsenthal and Henrietta Blumenfeld Felsenthal. Both of her parents were born in Germany.

Career 
Felsenthal was a social worker and Jewish community leader, based in Chicago. In 1893 she served on the Jewish women's committee at the Columbian Exposition. She was one of the founders and leaders of the National Council of Jewish Women, president of the Chicago chapter of the Council of Jewish Women, and vice-president of the National Association of Jewish Social Workers. She was superintendent of the Sinai West Side Sabbath School, and taught correspondence courses through the Jewish Chautauqua Society. 

Felsenthal worked one summer at Hull House with Jane Addams. Much of her social work involved the diverse needs of Jewish immigrants. In 1914, she was superintendent of the Jewish Welfare Society in Minneapolis. In 1930 Felsenthal endorsed the Griffin Bill, which would have allowed qualified applicants for naturalization to take the oath of United States citizenship without denying their religious or philosophical reservations about "the lawfulness of war as a means of settling international disputes."

Personal life 
Felsenthal remained active with Jewish women's organizations in Chicago until the last year of her life. She died in 1954, aged 87 years, in Chicago.

References

External links 

 
 Julia I. Felsenthal, "The Influence of the Jewish Religion in the Home" Papers of the Jewish Women's Congress (Chicago, 1893): 122-128.
 Julia I. Felsenthal, "Links of a Chain", The Advocate: America's Jewish Journal 41(May 6, 1911): 481.
 Letter from Julia I. Felsenthal to Jane Addams (October 25, 1908), in the Jane Addams Papers Project, Digital Edition.

1867 births
1954 deaths
American social workers
Jewish women
People from Chicago